August 20 - Eastern Orthodox liturgical calendar - August 22

All fixed commemorations below are observed on September 3 by Eastern Orthodox Churches on the Old Calendar.

For August 21, Orthodox Churches on the Old Calendar commemorate the Saints listed on August 8.

Feasts

 Afterfeast of the Dormition.

Saints

 Holy Forefathers Abraham, Isaac, and Jacob (ca. 2000 BC)
 Apostle Thaddeus of Edessa, one of the Seventy Apostles (44)
 Martyr Bassa of Edessa and her sons Theognius, Agapius, and Pistus (305-311)
 Saint Sarmean, Catholicos of Kartli, Georgia (774)
 Saint Theocleta the Wonderworker, of Asia Minor (840)
 Hieromartyrs Romulus, Priest, and the Deacons Donatus and Silvanus, and Martyr Venustus (Romania)
 Venerable Alexander of Iconium.

Pre-Schism Western saints

 Saint Euprepius of Verona, first Bishop of Verona in the north of Italy (1st century)
 Saint Cyriaca (Dominica), a wealthy widow in Rome, she sheltered persecuted Orthodox Christians (249)
 Saint Paternus, born in Alexandria, he came to Rome, was arrested in Fondi and was martyred for Orthodoxy there (c. 255)
 Saint Privatus, Bishop of Mende in France (260)
 Saint Anastasius, a military tribune converted to Orthodoxy on seeing the courage of the young St Agapitus, in Salone, Italy (274)
 Saint Quadratus, a Bishop of Utica in North Africa who taught both clergy and laity to confess Christ (3rd century)
 Martyrs Luxorius, Cisellus and Camerinus, martyrs in Sardinia beheaded under Diocletian (303)
 Saint Sidonius Apollinaris, Bishop of Clermont in France (c. 423-480)
 Saint Leontius the Elder, Bishop of Bordeaux in France and the predecessor of St Leontius the Younger (c. 541)
 Saint Avitus I, Bishop of Clermont, Gaul (594)
 Saint Eardwulf of Northumbria (Hardulph of Breedon) (c. 808)

Post-Schism Orthodox saints

 Saint Abramius the Lover-of-labor of the Kiev Caves
 Saint Abramius of Smolensk, Archimandrite, Wonderworker of Smolensk (1220), and his disciple St. Ephraim (1238)  (see also: August 20)
 Saint Isaiah of Mount Athos (14th century)
 Saint Cornelius, founder and abbot of Paleostrov Monastery (Palei Island, Valaam, Karelia) (1420), and his disciple St. Abramius (15th century)
 New Hieromartyr Symeon, Bishop of Samokovo, Bulgaria (1737)
 Saint Martha (Milyukova), schemanun of Diveyevo (1829)

New martyrs and confessors

 New Hieromartyr Alexander Yelokhovsky, Priest of Yaroslavl-Rostov (1918)
 New Hieromartyr Paul Yagodinsky, Priest of Yaransk (1937)
 New Hieromartyr Theodore Kallistov, Archpriest (1937)
 New Hieromartyr Raphael, Abbot of Sisatovac Monastery, Serbia (1941)
 New Hieromartyr Ignatius (Dalanov), Hieromonk of Optina Monastery (1942)

Other commemorations

 Translation of the relics (1953) of Saint Nectarius (Kephalas), Metropolitan of Pentapolis (North Africa) (1920)  (see also: September 3)
 Commemoration of Hieromonk John (Kotlyarevsky) at Poltava (1951)

Icon gallery

Notes

References

Sources
 August 21 / September 3. Orthodox Calendar (PRAVOSLAVIE.RU).
 September 3 / August 21. Holy Trinity Russian Orthodox Church (A parish of the Patriarchate of Moscow).
 August 21. OCA - The Lives of the Saints.
 The Autonomous Orthodox Metropolia of Western Europe and the Americas (ROCOR). St. Hilarion Calendar of Saints for the year of our Lord 2004. St. Hilarion Press (Austin, TX). p. 62.
 Menologion: The Twenty-First Day of the Month of August. Orthodoxy in China.
 August 21. Latin Saints of the Orthodox Patriarchate of Rome.
 The Roman Martyrology. Transl. by the Archbishop of Baltimore. Last Edition, According to the Copy Printed at Rome in 1914. Revised Edition, with the Imprimatur of His Eminence Cardinal Gibbons. Baltimore: John Murphy Company, 1916. pp. 251–252.
 Rev. Richard Stanton. A Menology of England and Wales, or, Brief Memorials of the Ancient British and English Saints Arranged According to the Calendar, Together with the Martyrs of the 16th and 17th Centuries. London: Burns & Oates, 1892. p. 404.

 Greek Sources
 Great Synaxaristes:  21 ΑΥΓΟΥΣΤΟΥ. ΜΕΓΑΣ ΣΥΝΑΞΑΡΙΣΤΗΣ.
  Συναξαριστής. 21 Αυγούστου. ECCLESIA.GR. (H ΕΚΚΛΗΣΙΑ ΤΗΣ ΕΛΛΑΔΟΣ).

 Russian Sources
  3 сентября (21 августа). Православная Энциклопедия под редакцией Патриарха Московского и всея Руси Кирилла (электронная версия). (Orthodox Encyclopedia - Pravenc.ru).

August in the Eastern Orthodox calendar